Wally Wallington is a retired construction worker from Lapeer County, Michigan, who has demonstrated methods for a single person to achieve the construction and manipulation of massive monoliths.

Work
He has constructed a concrete Stonehenge-like structure using only materials and techniques that do not rely on any modern machine-powered technology. He has demonstrated this technique on the Canadian science television program Daily Planet and also for the Discovery Channel.

Technique
His technique uses simple machines such as levers aided by counterweights and pivots. He says that he has successfully singlehandedly "walked" a twenty-ton barn and multi-thousand-pound concrete blocks using a beam lever and two pivots beneath the object and near the center of mass. These techniques might be comparable to those used by Edward Leedskalnin when he had single-handedly constructed his massive Coral Castle in Florida.

References

External links
Official website 

Living people
Year of birth missing (living people)
People from Flint, Michigan
Stonehenge replicas and derivatives
Experimental archaeology
Place of birth missing (living people)
People from Lapeer County, Michigan